Nemacheilus subfusca is a species of ray-finned fish from the family Nemacheilidae in the genus Nemacheilus which is found in Assam and China. It inhabits pebbly streams.  N. subfusca was synonymised with Neomacheilus scaturigina which was described by Menon from the collection of Hamilton. It was, however, then treated as a valid species and sometimes placed in the genus Schistura.

References

subfusca
Fish described in 1839
Taxobox binomials not recognized by IUCN